FlipTop Rap Battle League is the first and largest running professional rap battle conference in the Philippines founded by Alaric Riam Yuson (known as Anygma) in 2010. The league promotes Pinoy hip hop. FlipTop is heavily influenced by the original rap battle leagues in the West founded in 2008 – Grind Time Now (US), King of the Dot (Canada) and Don't Flop (UK), which inspired the creation of FlipTop and other battle leagues around the world. The league also branched out into several divisions after its success. The league is currently under management of a self-produced events and artist management company, FlipTop Kru Corp which was established also by Yuson.

Format 
FlipTop has three different battle formats which sometimes combined with Freestyle:

Rhyme – This format made by Joel Malupet David lang na nag tra-trabaho sa JB Music at ang Boss niya si Mae Fiona Flores. 
Written – This format allows use of written lyrics along with freestyle and is now the standard format used in battles.
Freestyle – At first the most common in all FlipTop tournaments, this format is now rarely done and has generally been replaced by the written format. Lyrics must be thought of during the battle.
Old School – Is essentially the freestyle format but is accompanied with an instrumental and is commonly used on tryouts.
There are also different variations of rap battle within the FlipTop tournament:
 Dos por Dos – Tag-team freestyle rap battle. It can be Emcee or Femcee, Freestyle or Written.
 Five on Five – Five-member team freestyle rap battle. It can be Emcee or Femcee, Freestyle or Written.
 Femcee Battle – All-female rap battle. It can be Freestyle or Written.
 Intergender Battle – Male vs. Female battle.
 Royal Rumble – A rap battle consists of more than two emcees randomly attack or bash each other.
 Secret Battle – Same as the other battles but with limited audience. Sometimes it surprisingly appeared in the day of the tournament unannounced.
 Won Minutes – Strictly one-minute per round format.
Promo Battle – A rap battle without any judging occurred. For theatrical performance and entertainment purpose only.

List of events 

 Notes

Noted battle emcees

Isabuhay Tournament winners

Dos Por Dos Winners 

 Notes Yelshawn and Bogchick faced and won against El D'No and 2Khelle for the 16th slot.

Guest emcees

Impact and criticism
FlipTop initially gained criticism for its use of strong language, mockery and bullying, prompting the city government of Makati to ban rap battles in the area. As time passed, the events gained acceptance with the help of official FlipTop YouTube channel gaining more than one million subscribers for which they received the Golden Play Button Award, and over two million likes on its Facebook fanpage. Some emcees in the league recently are more focused on line delivery, hyping the audience in the battle, and gimmicks rather than dissing to attack the opponent; emcees also improved their penmanship. After it gained success and reputation via social media, many amateur and other rap battles arose such as Sunugan, Word War, Bolero Rap Battles, Bahay Katay, Flipshop, Flipcap etc. Due to its freestyle and rhymed content, some academics consider it as modern-day "balagtasan" although some rap artists discourage the idea. Some educators consider FlipTop as 21st century Philippine literature. Some emcees involved in FlipTop have gained commercial success like Abra, Dello, Loonie, Smugglaz, Shehyee, and others, which caught media attention. Some lines spoken by the emcees in battles became popular phrases used in the Philippines.

Controversies

Sinio vs. Shehyee post battle off-stage
Due to the nature of the league and its mechanics, bashing or shaming emcees' relatives is inevitable during the battle. However, in an undercard match between Sinio and Shehyee during the Ahon 7 event on December 16, 2016, Shehyee threw disrespectful lines against Sinio's wife, Bie Sarmiento, during the battle. This led to Sinio aggressively rebutting Shehyee by dissing the latter's girlfriend, internet sensation Ann Mateo. Their match was uploaded on FlipTop's YouTube channel on February 2, 2017 and went viral with over five million views within four days. Sinio's harsh words about Ann Mateo received mixed reactions, and became a hot topic on social media. Controversy arose when Ann Mateo's mother saw the video and threatened Sinio with a lawsuit. Because of the situation, many netizens bashed Shehyee for being unprofessional for his failure to explain to his girlfriend's mother the mechanics of the league. Sinio felt that Shehyee was not to blame and that he understood Ann Mateo's mother's point-of-view. Shehyee tried to help Sinio in addressing the issue with Ann Mateo's mother. Ann Mateo did not share her reaction about the topic.

Reading lyrics during the battle 
When the battle between Pistolero vs Luxuria was uploaded to FlipTop Youtube Channel, viewers noticed Luxuria reading her written lyrics on her smartphone in the middle of the battle instead of memorizing it, raising concerns of unfairness and cheating.

Besides Luxuria, there have been other instances of rappers reading their lyrics. Dopee and his partner Snob was caught in their DosPorDos battle reading their lyrics on a piece of paper for a few seconds. In another instance, rapper LilWeng pulled out an earphone to listen to his verses.

References

External links 
 
 
 

 
2010 establishments in the Philippines